The Correspondents may refer to:

 The Correspondents (band), English electro-swing duo, based in London
 The Correspondents (TV series), investigative documentary television show in the Philippines (1998–2010)